Treasure State is a 2010 electronic music album, a collaboration by Matmos and So Percussion.

Critical reception

Jayson Greene, reviewing the album for Pitchfork Media, wrote that "Matmos have toned down their more outré side for this project" but "they have found marvelous partners in So Percussion, who add unprecedented levels of warmth and dimension to Matmos' busily crawling textures." Adam Kivel of Consequence of Sound gave a mixed review, concluding "if the two halves of the album could be better unified, there’d be a much greater album, but this isn’t bad for a first time collaboration."

Track listing

References

2010 albums
Matmos albums